Monova is a female form of Bulgarian and Russian surname Monov. Notable people with the surname include:

Ivelina Monova (born 1986), Bulgarian volleyball player
Polina Monova (born 1993), Russian tennis player

Bulgarian-language surnames
Russian-language surnames